Tihomir Todorov may refer to:

Tihomir Todorov (curler)
Tihomir Todorov (footballer)
Tihomir Todorov (swimmer)